Canada competed at the 1964 Summer Olympics in Tokyo, Japan. 115 competitors, 95 men and 20 women, took part in 92 events in 16 sports.

Medalists

Gold
 Roger Jackson and George Hungerford – Rowing, men's coxless pair

Silver
 Bill Crothers – Athletics, men's 800 m
 Doug Rogers – Judo, men's over 80 kg

Bronze
 Harry Jerome – Athletics, men's 100 m
Harry Jerome's 100 metre bronze medal win at the Tokyo 1964 Summer Olympics is captured in the documentary film Tokyo Olympiad (1965) directed by Kon Ichikawa. Slow motion close-up footage of Jerome (along with other athletes) preparing for the race begins at the 26 minute mark and then the race is shown in its entirety at full speed.

Athletics

Men's Competition
100 metres
 Harry Jerome
 Heat – 10.5
 Second round – 10.3
 Semi-final – 10.3
 Final – 10.2 (→  Bronze medal)

200 metres
 Harry Jerome
 Heat – 20.9
 Second round – 21.2
 Semi-final – 21.0
 Final – 20.8 (→ 4th place)

400 metres
 Bill Crothers
 Heat – 46.8
 Second round – 46.7
 Semi-final – 46.9 (→ did not advance)

800 metres
 Bill Crothers
 Heat – 1:49.3
 Semi-final – 1:47.3
 Final – 1:45.6 (→  Silver medal)
 Don Bertoia
 Heat – 1:52.2 (→ did not advance)

1.500 metres
 Ergas Leps
 Heat – 3:46.4
 Semi-final – 3:51.2 (→ did not advance)

5.000 metres
 Bruce Kidd
 Heat – 14:21.8  (→ did not advance)

10.000 metres
 Bruce Kidd
 Final – 30:56.4  (→ 26th place)

110 m hurdles
 Cliff Nuttall
 Heat – 14.8  (→ did not advance)

400 m hurdles
 Bill Gairdner
 Heat – 53.8  (→ did not advance)

20 km walk
 Alexander Oakley
 Final – did not finish  (→ no ranking)

50 km walk
 Alexander Oakley
 Final – 4:27:24.6  (→ 15th place)

Pole Vault
 Gerry Moro
 Final – 4m70  (→ 10th place)

Decathlon
 Bill Gairdner
 Total – 7147 points (→ 11th place)
 Gerry Moro
 Total – 6716 points (→ 11th place)

Basketball

Men's team competition
Preliminary round
 Canada – Soviet Union 52-87
 Canada – Hungary 59-70
 Canada – Japan 37-58
 Canada – Italy 54-66
 Canada – Mexico 68-78
 Canada – Puerto Rico 69-88
 Canada – Poland 69-74
Classification match
 Canada – Peru 82-81
Classification match
 Canada – Hungary 65-68 → 14th place
Team roster
 Walter Birtles
 John Dacyshyn
 Rolly Goldring
 Keith Hartley
 Barry Howson
 Fred Ingaldson
 James Maguire
 John McKibbon
 Warren Reynolds
 Ruby Richman
 Joseph Stulac
 George Stulac

Boxing

Men's flyweight (51 kg)
 John Henry
 First round – lost to Constantin Ciuca (ROM), DSQ

Men's lightweight (60 kg)
 Roger Palmer
 First round – defeated Gabriel Achy Assi (IVC), 3:2
 Second round – lost to Stoyan Pilichev (BUL), 0:5

Men's Light-Welterweight (63½ kg)
 Harvey Reti
 First round – bye
 Second round – lost to István Toth (HUN), 2:3

Men's welterweight (67 kg)
 Frederick Desrosiers
 First round – lost to Silvano Bertini (ITA), DSQ

Canoeing

Diving

Equestrian

Fencing

Three fencers, two men and one woman, represented Canada in 1964.

Men's foil
 John Andru
 Robert Foxcroft

Men's épée
 John Andru
 Robert Foxcroft

Men's sabre
 John Andru
 Robert Foxcroft

Women's foil
 Pacita Weidel

Gymnastics

Hockey

Men's team competition
Preliminary round
 Canada – Germany 1-5
 Canada – Netherlands 0-5
 Canada – Hong Kong 2-1
 Canada – Spain 0-3
 Canada – Belgium 1-5
 Canada – India 0-3
 Canada – Malaysia 2-3 → 14th place
Team roster
 Ronald Aldridge
 Derrick Anderson
 Anthony Boyd
 Peter Buckland
 Richard Chopping
 Gerd Heidinger
 Ian Johnston
 Harry Preston
 Alan Raphael
 Gerard Ronan
 Patrick Ruttle
 Peter Vander Pyl
 Victor Warren
 Lee Wright
 Andrew Yeoman
 John Young

Judo

Rowing

Sailing

Shooting

Six shooters represented Canada in 1964.

25 m pistol
 William Hare
 Garfield McMahon

50 m pistol
 Garfield McMahon
 William Hare

50 m rifle, three positions
 George Marsh
 Gil Boa

50 m rifle, prone
 Gil Boa
 George Marsh

Trap
 Floyd Nattrass
 Harry Willsie

Swimming

Weightlifting

Wrestling

References

  sports-reference
  Explorare

Nations at the 1964 Summer Olympics
1964
Summer Olympics